Dick Crealy and Onny Parun were the defending champions but competed this year with different partners. Crealy teamed up with Niki Pilić, and lost in the first round to Wojtek Fibak and Balázs Taróczy. Parun teamed up with Željko Franulović, and lost in the second round to Iván Molina and Jairo Velasco.

Brian Gottfried and Raúl Ramírez won in the final 6–4, 2–6, 6–2, 6–4 against John Alexander and Phil Dent.

Seeds

Draw

Finals

Top half

Section 1

Section 2

Bottom half

Section 3

Section 4

References

External links
1975 French Open – Men's draws and results at the International Tennis Federation

Men's Doubles
French Open by year – Men's doubles